This is a list of characters from The Last Blade.

Akari Ichijou

 is a 14-year-old girl in The Last Blade.

Born and raised in Tokyo, she was constantly battling diseases on her own until she finally understood her true calling: teleportation. When her older sister Hikari succumbed to disease, Akari became very agitated. At that time, their father called for her. She restlessly sat before her grim-faced father, who was about to give her a lecture about Hell's Gate. Akari found out that Hell's Gate was causing trouble again, and flew out of the room, bent on finding the perfect cure for her sister's disease on her own: sealing Hell's Gate. Her father accused her of not listening to what he said, but she was already gone.

Akari has had the most appearances as a playable character out of all of the cast in the Last Blade games, appearing in NeoGeo Battle Coliseum, SNK Gals' Fighters and SNK vs. Capcom for the Neo Geo Pocket Color.

Musashi Akatsuki

 is a legendary swordsman who once traveled the countryside, honing his skills and challenging worthy opponents along the way. During one of his battles he was killed by another swordsman. When Shinnosuke Kagami begins his plan to open Hell's Gate and bring about a new world order, he resurrects Musashi to further his plans and kill innocent people. To both their chagrins, while on one of his travels, Musashi was defeated. Honorable just like he was during his life, he bids farewell to his opponent, before dissolving in a beam of light.

Although a playable character in the first game (unlocked via a code), he is not allowed in matches. He has a crouching animation (which is uncommon for some bosses in SNK fighters). He is also selectable in the Dreamcast port of The Last Blade 2.

His character is based on the historical Miyamoto Musashi.

Genbu no Okina

 is a guardian of the demonic portal known as “Hell’s Gate”. For years, he and the other three guardians stood watch over its seal. For many years it was peaceful and Okina resigned himself to fishing and the complacent life of a hermit. Five years into his life of leisure, he was found by Kaede, who wished to train with him to improve his own sword skills. Okina taught the young man all he knew and Kaede left after he had improved his skills. Sensing the boy's departure and inquiry for training as a sign of trouble, Okina followed him at a distance.

Despite Kaede preventing the opening of the Gate, it had still not been sealed properly. As the oldest guardian, Okina was aware of that and knew that to properly seal the portal, the legendary “Sealing Maiden” was required to perform the ritual. He also discovered that an assassin called the “Messenger From Afar” was rumored to pursue the maiden. Determined to fulfill his role as a guardian, Okina set out on a journey.

Hibiki Takane

He had retired to an isolated area in the countryside with his daughter but continued his work with various swordsmen around the country. One fateful day, Setsuna approaches Genzō and requests that he forge a new sword. Though the man radiated an aura of pure, unfathomable evil, the master swordsmith finds himself unable to refuse the request. The labor renders him ill, however, and he is soon permanently bedridden.

He tells his daughter that the silver-haired man was the reason for his condition, and that she should pursue him and the sword that he had forged. With a concerned Hibiki by his side, he utters his last words: “The thing that I saw... that I felt, even you must understand.” Though she was confused by her father's cryptic request, Hibiki gathers her belongings and leaves in search of the silver-haired man.

Several days later, a man named Hyo Amano stops by, hoping that Genzō would repair his weapon, the “Otokomae”, when he learns of the swordsmith's death, he sets out to find his daughter.

Hibiki has 2 endings in the game; one of them involve her deciding to improve her swordsmanship which can be gained if the player defeats the opponents they face in Arcade mode with her super moves in every round.

She is a playable character in Capcom vs. SNK 2, with her Speed Mode 'Custom Combos' from Last Blade 2 given to her as super moves. In addition she has some different animations to her supers in Capcom vs. SNK 2. In Capcom, she appears to be slightly more aggressive, with her tone becoming a little colder and higher. She also did not show any compassion or regret towards the opponent she just slashed. In a special ending with her defeating her enemy using her most powerful desperation move, the Shiosoregu, she told her opponent not to mess with her in the first place. However, during her ending, she still expressed sorrow, questioning if she was following the path her father wished.

She is also a playable DLC character in Samurai Shodown.

Hyo Amano

 is characterized by his outlandish mannerisms and flamboyant personality. He uses the element of fire in some of his attacks as well as special techniques involving sakura petals. His role in The Last Blade is somewhat ambiguous. As a carefree and fun-loving individual, Hyo has a strong love for sake, women, and the thrill of the fight. When he discovers the petals of the beautiful cherry trees falling from their branches, he panics and decides he must go defeat opponents to solve the “problem”. In the end, he discovers it was only the changing of the seasons that resulted in the petals falling from the trees.

After learning of the cause for the various Sakura trees petals falling, Hyo is devastated to learn that the sky is turning a dreadful gray color due to the re-opening of “Hell's Gate”. He draws his sword, but finds it oddly dull and fragile. In order to fix it, he decides to ask his friend Takane Genzō, a master swordsmith, to fix it. However, his friend has died. Amano discovers that he had a daughter (Hibiki Takane) who had recently departed the household. Concerned for his sword and for Hibiki, he sets off to locate her.

Hyo's ending in both games is interesting in that the player must choose one of two (or three in the first game) choices, each of which causes Hyo to behave differently.

Juzoh Kanzaki

 is characterized as a power-type character in gameplay. He is the adopted brother of Akari Ichijou (he was orphaned earlier in his childhood). Despite this, he and his adoptive family are very close. At home, he is generally free-spirited and somewhat lazy. Sometime during this, he learned how to use a club with his brute strength (apparently to pass the time). While in the course of his usual lying around the house with little to keep him preoccupied, he was knocked out and kidnapped by Akari, who “persuaded” him to accompany her on a journey to discover the landmark known as the “Gate of Hell”.

After their adventure, their sister Hikari falls ill and the two become extremely concerned about her health. One day as Juzoh is visiting Hikari, she discloses that their sister Akari had run away to “Hell's Gate” again to find a cure for her curse. To lay both their fears to rest, Juzoh pursues her on her quest.

Juzo's move list underwent a drastic change in Last Blade 2 where some of his moves from the first game were either removed or revamped.

Kaede

 is considered the main protagonist of the series. His name means “maple” in Japanese, and the series features many maple decorations as his motif, including a golden stylized maple leaf on the back of his vest.

He was the son of a warrior named Gaisei. Gaisei was a master swordsman who trained him with two other orphans, Moriya Minakata and Yuki. As he grew, he became an avid swordsman and powerful warrior. One day, when he was twelve, he and Yuki returned from an errand to discover their master slain and Moriya standing over his corpse. Enraged, Kaede physically attacked him for the (presumed) killing of their master. Moriya withstood the attack and left in silence.

Shortly thereafter, Kaede and Yuki depart their foster home to avenge the death of their master and confront the killer. Five years on their quest, he still searches for Moriya. He eventually discovers that the real killer of his master was one of the four guardians of hell, Shinnosuke Kagami. He engages him, but the guardian's superior skill quickly overpowers him. However, it is revealed that Kaede possesses the power of the legendary dragon Seiryū, transforming various physical aspects and giving him additional power. With his transformation into , he defeats Kagami.

After honing his skills and learning to control the power of the Seiryū to a greater extent, Kaede and Yuki set off to the Okina in order to find more information. When they arrive, they discover that the “Sealing Rite” needs to be performed, for a great evil threatens the world. This rite is to be performed by a special maiden, but a warrior named the “Messenger From Afar” seeks to assassinate her and prevent her from performing it. Kaede sets out to protect the maiden and to allow her to accomplish her mission.

Kaede also appears in The King of Fighters 2000 as a special striker for Ryo Sakazaki. In addition, Moriya, Akari & Washizuka are playable characters in NeoGeo Battle Coliseum.

For some unknown reason, Garou: Mark of the Wolves (Kengo Asai's later works) character Rock Howard shares a similar trait with Kaede's awakened form: aside from the blond hair, both also have red eyes (this is in contrast to the similarities between Sakura Mitsukoshi from Kengo Asai's previous works Money Puzzle Exchanger and Sakura Kinomoto from Clamp's Cardcaptor Sakura, as both of them have green eyes and voiced by Sakura Tange, Eiji Takemoto's then castmate in Aoni Production). Possibly due to this, one of Rock's alternate outfits in The King of Fighters 2006 is that of Kaede's.

Keiichiro Washizuka

 is a fictional unit leader of the real life Shinsengumi, a police-like group during the Bakumatsu era. He is a firm believer in restoring order to Japan, and in the old ways of Samurai sword fighting. As such, he carries a very serious persona. He is extremely loyal to his Shinsengumi unit, and is a friend of Kojiroh Sanada. He is the only one in the unit who is aware that “Kojiroh” is actually Kojiroh's sister Kaori.

Kojiroh Sanada

 was the captain of the fictional Shinsengumi Unit Zero, which investigated demonic forces in Japan, following the concept of Bushidō. After Kojiroh dies investigating “Hell’s Gate”, his sister Kaori disguises herself as him, using his identity in order to investigate the evils within, as well as to restore the faith in the Shinsengumi. She also travels to finish off the former Shinsengumi, Shikyoh. Washizuka is the only known person to know her true identity.

Kaori shares similar moves with Washizuka, but does not perform them via the "charge" mechanism.

Kouryu

 (or rather,  in his new form) is the legendary warrior that trained Kaede, Yuki and Moriya Minakata. After Shinnosuke Kagami’s aborted plan to remove the seal on “Hell’s Gate” and bring about a new world order, Gaisei presumably stood up against the guardian in an attempt to stop him. Unfortunately, Shinnosuke is too powerful, and he dies in the battle. He is later discovered by his three students, who all vow to take revenge on his killer. Kaede accomplishes this, activating his power of the Seiryū and defeating Shinnosuke. This also clears Moriya's reputation, as he was originally blamed for killing Gaisei.

In The Last Blade 2, Gaisei is still deceased. However, an unknown force of evil resurrects him and drives the now-undead warrior insane. Additionally, he manages to combine the legendary powers of Suzaku, Seiryuu, Byakko and Genbu into his being, making him much more powerful than before. The now godlike warrior roams the lands and is called “Kouryu”, the Yellow Dragon.

Lee Rekka

 hails from Qing dynasty China, where he learned a martial art that allows the user to control fire and involves the use of fans and powerful kicks. One day, he witnessed a “red star” (the opening of “Hell's Gate”). Knowing it to be a sign of great evil, he travels from his homeland of China to stop the evil before it spreads across the world.

After the closing of the Gate, he remained in Japan. He continued to study and improve his skills in the martial arts while earning a modest living at a nearby farm. When he senses the re-opening of Hell's Gate, he stops his training to investigate once more.

His ending in The Last Blade 2 seems to indicate that he took the wrong ship and ended in America instead of returning China. He is based on the historical Chinese martial arts master from Foshan, Wong Fei-hung.

Moriya Minakata

 is a young swordsman in training under a legendary teacher named Gaisei. Under his tutelage, along with Kaede and Yuki, he became great swordsman. For many years, they lived happily together while learning bushidō.

One day he discovered his master dead, and the killer was nowhere to be found. Kaede sees him over the body, and seeks to slay him under the belief he slew Gaisei. With this, he sets out on the run. Not only does he wish to avoid this confrontation, but he also seeks the man named Shinnosuke Kagami (who was the real killer) in order clear his name. However, after over five years of searching, Moriya has yet to find Kagami, who is defeated by Kaede instead.

After failing to take revenge upon Kagami, Moriya recluses himself to the wilderness to improve his skills and techniques. During this time, he finds within himself an urge to “return” to the portal known as “Hell’s Gate”. Ceasing his training, he travels in order to seek the truth.

In Neo Geo Battle Coliseum, Moriya tells to Kyo Kusanagi that his master Gaisei was also having heard about the Kusanagi clan.

Setsuna

 is a powerful spirit that was released after Kagami was defeated by Kaede. Finding a deceased baby on a field of battle, he possesses it. After maturing his human form into an adult, he walks the path of destruction, killing and filled with hate for the human race. He uses a black katana-like blade, which leaves a trail of dark energy in its wake.

He is directly responsible for the death of Hibiki's father, forcing him by sheer charisma to forge his sword and work on it to the utter limit.

Shigen Naoe

 is a guardian of a portal called the “Hell’s Gate”. Before the events of the first game, he is magically sealed in a massive stone for ten years by a friend who perceived him to be a threat. He eventually escaped, but clouded by his rage and anger, he could only think of getting back at his captor. He set out to exact revenge.

By the events of The Last Blade 2, Shigen had regained his senses and remembered that he had a daughter. To atone for his ten-year absence, he traveled to the mountains to spend time with her while training. During this timeframe, he noticed the evil aura that emanated from the opened “Hell’s Gate”. As one of its guardians, he set out to close it, leaving his sleeping daughter in the darkness of night. However, he was initially unaware that his daughter knew of his departure and that she was following him at a distance.

There is a code that the player can enter at the character select screen so that when playing as Shigen, his daughter will appear instead of him as his intro before a match.

Shigen, along with Yuki, Gaisei & Zantetsu are the only known characters to die after the events of Last Blade 2.

Shikyoh

 is a previous member of the Shinsengumi, an organization that was to protect the weak. However, Shikyoh merely joined to kill innocents. When his superiors and comrades discovered this, they resolved to punish him, but he escaped before they could take action. When he discovered the opening of the “Hell’s Gate”, he thought it a perfect opportunity to continue his killing spree and set out in search of more prey.

After his death, Shikyoh was re-animated in the form of a zombie named . With his love of killing still fresh in his mind along with his few memories and fighting style, Mukuro wanders the land in his undead form, continuing to kill innocents.

Shinnosuke Kagami

 is featured as a boss character in The Last Blade and was toned down to be regular playable character in the sequel.

Shinnosuke is one of the guardians of “Hell’s Gate”, a portal that allows demons and evil energy to seep through to the mortal plane humans call Earth. After residing over his position and finding (or so he thought) that the humans he protected were weak and inferior to himself, he decides to release the seal on the portal. Along with this, he goes on a horrific killing spree, murdering various warriors including Gaisei.

After five years of preparatory action to unseal the gate, including imprisoning his fellow guardian, Shigen Naoe, Shinnosuke is eventually found by Kaede, who has the latent power of the Seiryū. Kaede defeats him; humiliated by his defeat, Shinnosuke is thrown into the depths of Hell's Gate as eternal punishment. However, he is soon reincarnated in a new form to fulfill his role as a guardian, as the portal is being opened by another force. Shinnosuke sets out to fulfill his destiny, and to seek atonement.

Yuki

 is the daughter of a foreign family that managed ship trades; unfortunately, her family died in a ship accident. She is later adopted by a warrior named Gaisei, who trains her along with two other students: Moriya Minakata and Kaede. Unlike her fellow companions, she picks up the naginata instead of the katana. She also secretly harbors feelings for Moriya over the course of her training.

The year she turns 13, she returns with Kaede to find their teacher dead and Moriya standing over the body. Mortified, she watched as Kaede attacked Moriya. Moriya silently took his leave shortly thereafter. She and Kaede then embarked on a five-year journey, eventually discovering the truth: a powerful swordsman named Shinnosuke Kagami was the one who had murdered their master. She assists Kaede in defeating Kagami, both avenging their master's death and clearing Moriya's name.

In The Last Blade 2, Yuki and Kaede discover that she is the maiden that is to perform the sealing of evil, as evidenced by her necklace and its recent glowing. After this, she and Kaede part ways and she is left to make her decision about her destiny, which she eventually took part of, and sacrifices her life in the process.

Zantetsu

 is one of the last of numerous ninja clans that roam ancient Japan. Due to the decline of the ninja population, the Japanese common folk begin to consider the title “ninja” a thing to scoff at. Determined to prove the superiority of his people, he challenges warriors time and time again to prove his strength. When he hears of the opening of a portal called “Hell’s Gate”, he sets out to defeat the enemies within to prove his strength.

At the outset of The Last Blade 2, Zantetsu resides in his village, and teaches his grandson the way of the ninja in order to continue their legacy. However, he is aware that he will pass away in the near future and wishes to prove his strength once more before his eventual death. He once again travels to “Hell’s Gate” to experience a great battle.

It is heavily implied that he is Eiji Kisaragi's ancestor.

External links
Endings for the Last Blade 1 & 2 characters

Last Blade
Last Blade, The